Blaxland High School is a government-operated comprehensive secondary school located in Blaxland, a suburb in the Blue Mountains region of New South Wales, Australia.

Established in 1977, the school enrolled approximately 1,000 students in 2018, from Year 7 to Year 12, of whom five percent identified as Indigenous Australians and eight percent were from a language background other than English. The school is operated by the NSW Department of Education.

Subjects 

Blaxland High School teaches a range of subjects throughout the grades of class.

Creative arts 

 Dance
 Drama
 Music
 Visual arts
 Voice works
 Photography and Digital Media
 Vocational educational training (VET) entertainment
 VET entertainment specialisation

Languages 

 English
 Italian

Mathematics 

 Mathematics Standard 1
 Mathematics Standard 2
 Mathematics Advanced (from 2019)
 Mathematics Extension 1
 Mathematics Extension 2

Human society and its environment 

 Aboriginal Studies
 Ancient History
 Business Studies
 History Extension
 Legal Studies
 Modern History
 Society and Culture
 Studies of Religion

Personal development, health and physical education 

 Personal Development, Health and Physical Education
 Sport, Lifestyle and Recreation Studies

Science 

 Biology
 Chemistry
 Earth and Environmental Science
 Investigating Science
 Physics

Technological and applied studies 

 Agricultural Technology
 Design and Technology
 Food Technology
 Graphics Technology
 Industrial Technology
 Information and Software Technology
 Textiles Technology
 Design and Technology
 Engineering Studies
 Software Design and Development
 Textiles and Design
 Community and Family Studies

Sexual Assault Case 
In 2019 the head of the Performing Arts, David Leishman was found guilty of sexually touching another person. At the time, the pupil was 15 years old.

Leishman was sentenced to 12 months in prison in April at Penrith District Court on the touching charges, with a nine-month non-parole period. On the kissing accusation, he was sentenced to 13 months in prison with a nine-month non-parole period.

Chemical spill incident 
In February 2019, the school was evacuated after a hazardous chemical spill that occurred in the Science Lab store room. Calcium Carbide powder is highly explosive if contacted with water, resulting in the school being evacuated as a precaution by the St Mary's Fire and Rescue NSW team who responded to the incident. There were no injuries to teachers or students.

Cars for Refugees 

In 2018, Shaun Halden's Industrial Arts class set out on a project to rebuild cars that were donated to the school that would then be donated to refugee families. Mr Halden was introduced to the project by the Blue Mountains Refugee Support Group, which was hoping to find cars for refugees in need, and Halden set to get his students involved.

Notable alumni 

 Jessica FoxBronze Medal Winner 2016 Summer Olympics, Silver Medal Winner 2012 Summer Olympics, Gold Medal Winner 2020 Summer Olympics
 Noemie FoxBronze Medal Winner - Under 23 Canoe Slalom World Championships
 Peter FoxOlympic canoeist
 Amanda ReidNAIDOC Sportsperson of the Year, two-time Paralympian and silver medalist
 Peter Wallaceprofessional rugby league footballer
 Adam Graham Giles - former Chief Minister of the Northern Territory (2013–2016) Lewis, B. C. (20 June 2013). "Adam Giles' journey from Blaxland High to running the Northern Territory". Blue Mountains Gazette. Retrieved 9 August 2014.

References 

Public high schools in New South Wales
1977 establishments in Australia
Educational institutions established in 1977
Education in the Blue Mountains (New South Wales)